Jack Martin Cloud (January 1, 1925 – June 19, 2010) was an American football linebacker and fullback in the National Football League for the Green Bay Packers and the Washington Redskins. He was inducted into the Virginia Sports Hall of Fame in 1984 and the College Football Hall of Fame in 1990.

Early life
Cloud attended and played high school football at Matthew Fontaine Maury High School in Norfolk, Virginia.  After graduation, he served three years in the United States Air Force before college.

College career
Cloud attended and played college football at the College of William & Mary, where he scored five touchdowns in one game and set a school scoring record of 102 points in 1947.

Professional career
Cloud was drafted in the sixth round of the 1950 NFL Draft by the Green Bay Packers (1950–1951).  He then played for the Washington Redskins (1952–1953).

Coaching and the Navy
After retiring from the NFL, Cloud became an assistant coach at William & Mary in 1954.  The following year, he became the athletic director and head coach at Naval Station Norfolk (1955–1958).  He then joined the staff at the United States Naval Academy, where he had a 22-year career as lightweight coach and assistant varsity coach.  After retiring from coaching, Cloud was an associate professor of physical education and special assistant to the director of athletics.  He retired in 1990.

References

External links
 

1925 births
2010 deaths
American football fullbacks
American football linebackers
United States Army Air Forces personnel of World War II
Green Bay Packers players
Navy Midshipmen football coaches
Washington Redskins players
William & Mary Tribe football coaches
William & Mary Tribe football players
College Football Hall of Fame inductees
Sportspeople from Oklahoma City
Sportspeople from Norfolk, Virginia
Players of American football from Norfolk, Virginia
Military personnel from Oklahoma